The Beit Yehuda Synagogue, also known as Assayag Synagogue, is a cultural landmark and museum in Tangier, Morocco.

Overview

Unlike other Moroccan cities, Tangier had no walled Jewish quarter or mellah. Even so, its synagogues were clustered in a neighborhood on the southwestern side of the medina, known as Beni Idder for the family that initiated its development.

The Beit Yehuda Synagogue was founded in 1890 slightly north of Beni Idder on the other side of rue Es-Siaghine. It remained in service until the late 1950s. It was then abandoned for about six decades. 

The former synagogue's revival as a museum was one of the cultural initiatives launched by the Moroccan government in the wake of the Israel–Morocco normalization agreement of December 2020. The renovation was led by architect Malika Laâroussi, and the creation of the museum by museographer Isabelle Timsit.

See also
 Haim Benchimol
 History of Moroccan Jews
 List of synagogues in Morocco

Notes

Buildings and structures in Tangier
Tourist attractions in Tangier
Synagogues in Morocco